"Memory of the Future" is a song by English synth-pop duo Pet Shop Boys from their eleventh studio album, Elysium (2012). It was released on 31 December 2012 as the album's third and final single. The track reached number 68 in Germany and number 111 in the United Kingdom.

The single version, remixed by Stuart Price, differs notably from the album version. Apart from the differences in the arrangements, the single version is approximately a minute shorter than the album version and has a slightly faster tempo.
The single was promoted with a lyric video.

Track listings

Charts

References

2012 singles
2012 songs
Parlophone singles
Pet Shop Boys songs
Songs written by Chris Lowe
Songs written by Neil Tennant